= Jul, Azerbaijan =

Former Armenian settlement in Nakhchivan, Azerbaijan

Jul or Djul is the former Armenian settlement in the Nakhchivan region. In 1865 there was one old Armenian church in the village, which was built on upland in the center of two hundred houses. A large poplars grove was also in the proximity of the village.
